Andrew Steven Bown (born 27 March 1946) is an English musician, who has specialised in keyboards and bass guitar. He is a member of the rock band Status Quo.

Career
Bown's first major band was The Herd, along with Peter Frampton. After The Herd dissolved he spent two years with Judas Jump who were the opening act of the Isle of Wight Festival 1970. He played [keyboards at first] for Frampton in the 1970s then switched to bass briefly when Rick Wills departed the Peter Frampton band in early 1975. Bown himself left the Frampton entourage less than a year later, just as Frampton was on the verge of achieving worldwide success. He went back to England where he first dabbled with a solo career (recording two solo albums for Bill Gaff's GM label, US Mercury), then resumed work with Status Quo whom he started playing keyboards for in 1973 as a session musician, including sessions with Jerry Lee Lewis on the London Sessions Album.  Andy first appeared on Quo's Hello! album in that year; performing on every album by the band from 1977's Rockin' All Over the World onwards, and supporting them in concert. He joined Status Quo as a full member in 1982, and has been with them ever since.

Bown released a number of singles in the 1970s, including "New York Satyricon Zany" and "Another Shipwreck", none of which charted. His most well-known song however was the theme tune to the children's series Ace of Wands, "Tarot". He also released five albums, the first of which, Gone to My Head, was released in 1972.

His latest solo album Unfinished Business was released on 5 September 2011. The album was produced by Mike Paxman and recorded by Chris West, it features contributions from Henry Spinetti on drums, Mick Rogers on guitars, Trevor Bolder and Brad Lang on basses as well as vocalists Juliet Roberts and Sylvia Mason-James. It was recorded at State of the Ark Studios in Richmond, Surrey in 2010.

He was the bass player in the "Surrogate Band" during Pink Floyd's The Wall tour in 1980 and 1981 and can be heard on the live album Is There Anybody Out There? The Wall Live 1980–81. He also did some keyboards for Pink Floyd's The Final Cut album. and on Jack the Lad's last album Jackpot in 1976.  In addition he played Hammond organ and 12-string guitar during the recording of Roger Waters' solo album The Pros and Cons of Hitch Hiking in 1984, but did not take part in Waters' subsequent tours.

He still plays keyboards, guitar and harmonica with Status Quo, and is an integral part of the band, having co-written many well known Quo songs on various studio albums, most prominently collaborating with Rick Parfitt on the group's 1979 hit "Whatever You Want".

Discography
Gone to My Head – 1972
Sweet William – 1973
Come Back Romance, All is Forgiven – 1977
Good Advice – 1978
Unfinished Business – 2011

Equipment 

During live performances Bown uses a Roland RD-700 piano, a Hammond C3 Organ and a Roland D-70 synthesizer, which are connected to a Roland U-220, an E-mu Vintage Keys module, an Akai Sampler and a Leslie speaker.

Bown uses a vintage Fender Telecaster, a Gibson Les Paul, a Washburn semi-acoustic as well as a Takamine acoustic.
He also uses custom Telecaster types and a Stratocaster-type made by J Davey Guitars, and sometimes uses Rick Parfitt's custom-made Fender Telecaster Thinline

References

External links

Official website

Status Quo (band) members
Living people
1946 births
English rock keyboardists
English rock bass guitarists
Male bass guitarists
Musicians from London
English session musicians
The Herd (British band) members
People from Beckenham